Kingmaker (known as Kingmaker: The Quest for the Crown in Europe) is a turn-based strategy game published by Avalon Hill in 1993. It was developed by American studio TM Games based on the Kingmaker board game.

Gameplay
Kingmaker simulates Wars of the Roses. Kingmaker reproduces the look and play of the board game almost exactly, allowing the player to compete with up to five computer controlled factions.  The major change from the board game is the addition of a battle interface where the player can control his or her army in combat, but it is very simplistic and the option to resolve battles by the original method remains.

Reception

In Computer Gaming World in July 1994, Terry Lee Coleman rated the computer version of Kingmaker 3.5 stars out of five. While criticizing the lack of multiplayer in an adaptation of "a classic multiplayer boardgame" the reviewer said that it was "strangely addictive, and a class act". Approving of the "clever and varied AI", Coleman wrote, "Challenging and fun, despite its lack of high-tech glitz or multiplayer options, Kingmaker establishes a fine beachhead for AH's return to the computer wargame market."

The editors of PC Gamer US nominated Kingmaker for their 1994 "Best Historical Simulation" award, although it lost to Lords of the Realm.

By August 1996, Kingmaker had sold over 40,000 copies. In his Computer Gaming World column, Coleman summarized these figures as "decent for a computer wargame". However, he noted that it had outsold every Avalon Hill computer game released since, and that Avalon Hill's brand reboot on computers had not gone as hoped.

Reviews
Amiga Action, Jan 1994
PC Gamer, Jul 1994
Amiga User International, Mar 1994
Amiga Format, Dec 1993
Amiga Games, Feb 1994
PC Player, Dec 1993

References

External links
PC Gamer review (German)

1993 video games
Amiga games
Atari ST games
Avalon Hill video games
DOS games
U.S. Gold games
Video games based on board games
Video games developed in the United States